Patricof is a surname. Notable people with the surname include:

Alan Patricof (born 1934), American investor
Jamie Patricof, American movie and television producer 
Jon Patricof (born 1973), American businessman, son of Alan and brother of Jamie